Sir Aaron Klug  (11 August 1926 – 20 November 2018) was a British biophysicist and  chemist. He was a winner of the 1982 Nobel Prize in Chemistry for his development of crystallographic electron microscopy and his structural elucidation of biologically important nucleic acid-protein complexes.

Early life and education

Klug was born in Želva, in Lithuania, to Jewish parents Lazar, a cattleman, and Bella (née Silin) Klug, with whom he emigrated to South Africa at the age of two. He was educated at Durban High School. Paul de Kruif's 1926 book,  Microbe Hunters, aroused his interest in microbiology.

He started to study microbiology, but then moved into physics and maths, graduating with a Bachelor of Science degree at the University of the Witwatersrand, in Johannesburg.  He studied physics and obtained his Master of Science degree at the University of Cape Town. He was awarded an 1851 Research Fellowship from the Royal Commission for the Exhibition of 1851, which enabled him to move to England, completing his PhD in research physics at Trinity College, Cambridge in 1953.

Career and research
Following his PhD, Klug moved to Birkbeck College in the University of London in late 1953, and started working with virologist Rosalind Franklin in the lab of crystallographer John Bernal. This experience aroused a lifelong interest in the study of viruses, and during his time there he made discoveries in the structure of the tobacco mosaic virus. In 1962 he moved to the newly built Medical Research Council (MRC) Laboratory of Molecular Biology (LMB) in Cambridge. Over the following decade Klug used methods from X-ray diffraction, microscopy and structural modelling to develop crystallographic electron microscopy in which a sequence of two-dimensional images of crystals taken from different angles are combined to produce three-dimensional images of the target. He studied the structure of transfer RNA, and found what is known as zinc fingers as well as the neurofibrils in Alzheimer's disease.

Also in 1962 Klug had been offered a teaching Fellowship at Peterhouse, Cambridge. After receiving the Nobel Prize in Chemistry in 1982, he went on teaching because he found the courses interesting and was later made an Honorary Fellow at the College.

Between 1986 and 1996 he was director of the Laboratory of Molecular Biology in Cambridge.
Klug served on the Advisory Council for the Campaign for Science and Engineering. He also served on the Board of Scientific Governors at The Scripps Research Institute.
He and Dai Rees approached the Wellcome Trust to found the Wellcome Sanger Institute, which was a key player in the Human Genome Project.

Awards and honours
Klug was awarded the Louisa Gross Horwitz Prize from Columbia University in 1981. He was knighted by Elizabeth II in 1988. In 1969 he was elected a Fellow of the Royal Society (FRS), the oldest national scientific institution in the world. He was elected its President (PRS) from 1995 to 2000. He was appointed to the Order of Merit in 1995 – as is customary for Presidents of the Royal Society. His certificate of election to the Royal Society reads: 

Klug was a member of the American Academy of Arts and Sciences and the American Philosophical Society

In 2000, Klug received the Golden Plate Award of the American Academy of Achievement. In 2005, he was awarded South Africa's Order of Mapungubwe (gold) for exceptional achievements in medical science. He was elected a Fellow of the Academy of Medical Sciences (FMedSci), also in 2005.

In 2013, Israel's Ben-Gurion University of the Negev dedicated their centre for structural biology in Klug's name, Aaron Klug Integrated Centre for Biomolecular Structure. He, his family and the then-British Ambassador to Israel Matthew Gould, were in attendance. Klug was  associated with the university and the town of Be'er Sheva, having visited them numerous times.

Personal life
Klug married Liebe Bobrow in 1948. Though Klug had faced discrimination in South Africa, he remained religious and according to Sydney Brenner, he became more religious in his older age.

See also
 List of presidents of the Royal Society

References

Further reading

 Aaron Klug tells his life story at Web of Stories
Aaron Klug interviews with Harry Kroto
Aaron Klug article by Bob Weintraub
 Aaron Klug interviewed by Alan Macfarlane 11 December 2007 (video)
 Listen to an oral history interview with Aaron Klug – a life story interview recorded for National Life Stories at the British Library
Aaron Klug, Nobel Luminaries Project, The Museum of the Jewish People at Beit Hatfutsot

External links 
 
 
The Papers of Sir Aaron Klug held at Churchill Archives Centre

1926 births
2018 deaths
Academics of Birkbeck, University of London
Alumni of Trinity College, Cambridge
British Nobel laureates
British biophysicists
English Nobel laureates
Fellows of Peterhouse, Cambridge
Fellows of the Academy of Medical Sciences (United Kingdom)
Fellows of the Royal Microscopical Society
Foreign associates of the National Academy of Sciences
Jewish biophysicists
Jewish scientists
Jewish British scientists
Jewish Nobel laureates
Knights Bachelor
Lithuanian emigrants to South Africa
Lithuanian emigrants to the United Kingdom
Lithuanian Jews
Lithuanian Nobel laureates
Members of the French Academy of Sciences
Members of the Order of Merit
Naturalised citizens of the United Kingdom
Nobel laureates in Chemistry
Presidents of the Royal Society
Recipients of the Copley Medal
South African emigrants to the United Kingdom
South African Nobel laureates
Scripps Research
University of Cape Town alumni
University of the Witwatersrand alumni
Winners of the Heineken Prize
Members of the American Philosophical Society